Treena Livingston Arinzeh is Professor of Biomedical Engineering at Columbia University in New York, New York, joining in 2022. She was formerly a Distinguished Professor in Biomedical Engineering at the New Jersey Institute of Technology in Newark, New Jersey. She is known for her research on adult stem-cell therapy. Arinzeh takes part in the American Chemical Society's Project Seeds program, opening up her lab for high school students from economically disadvantaged backgrounds for summer internships.

Early life and education
Arinzeh was born in 1970 and raised in Cherry Hill, New Jersey. She became interested in science by conducting imaginary experiments in the kitchen with her mother, who was a home economics teacher. She was encouraged to pursue a STEM career by her high school physics teacher.

Arinzeh studied Mechanical Engineering at Rutgers University, receiving a B.S. in 1992. She earned a M.S.E. in biomedical engineering from Johns Hopkins University in 1994. She continued her graduate studies at  the University of Pennsylvania, completing a PhD in Biomedical Engineering in 1999.

Research and career 
Arinzeh worked for Baltimore-based Osiris Therapeutics as a product development engineer. In 2001, she returned to academia and started working at the New Jersey Institute of Technology (NJIT) in Newark, New Jersey, where she founded the first Tissue Engineering and Applied Biomaterials Laboratory at NJIT in the fall of 2001. She currently still works at NJIT as Professor of Biomedical Engineering. She has published over 60 journal articles, conference proceedings, and book chapters.

Her current research focuses on systematic studies of the effect of biomaterial properties on stem cell differentiation. She is known for discovering that mixing stem cells with scaffolding allows regeneration of bone growth and the repair of tissue damage. She also discovered that one person's stem cells could be implanted in another person without causing an adverse immune response. In 2018, she received an QED award to work on the recovery time and cost patients experience after bone grafting procedures.

She is a fellow of the American Institute for Medical and Biological Engineering (AIMBE) and the Biomedical Engineering Society (BMES).

She is currently a co-PI and the Director of Diversity of the NSF Science and Technology Center on Engineering Mechano-Biology, which is a multi-institutional center with the University of Pennsylvania and Washington University in St. Louis. In addition, Arinzeh actively tries to increase representation of minority students in biomedical engineering by being a mentor as part of the Project Seeds program supported by the American Chemical Society. Every summer, she invites 40 to 50 teens from under-represented groups to her lab to learn about engineering and her research.

In 2018, Arinzeh was selected to be a Judge for Nature scientific journal's newly created Innovating Science Panel Award.

Awards
2018: QED Award recipient 
2018: George Bugliarello Prize winner 
2010: Grio Awards recipient 
2004: Presidential Early Career Award for Scientists and Engineers recipient 
2003: Faculty Early Career Development Award recipient, awarded by the National Science Foundation

Select Publications 

 2017: Three-dimensional piezoelectric fibrous scaffolds selectively promote mesenchymal stem cell differentiation. Biomaterials.
 2015: The effect of PVDF-TrFE scaffolds on stem cell derived cardiovascular cells. Biotechnology & Bioengineering. 
 2015: An investigation of common crosslinking agents on the stability of electrospun collagen scaffolds. Journal of Biomedical Materials Research. 
 2013: Examining the formulation of emulsion electrospinning for improving the release of bioactive proteins from electrospun fibers. Journal of Biomedical Materials Research. 
 2005: "A comparative study of biphasic calcium phosphate ceramics for human mesenchymal stem-cell-induced bone formation" Biomaterials.

Notes

References

Further reading
 “Treena Livingston Arinzeh Receives Innovators Award from NJ Inventors Hall of Fame.” New Jersey Institute of Technology, NJIT News Room, 28 Oct. 2013, www6.njit.edu/news/2013/2013-352.php.

1970 births
Living people
American biomedical engineers
African-American women engineers
American women engineers
African-American engineers
African-American academics
People from Cherry Hill, New Jersey
People from West Orange, New Jersey
Rutgers University alumni
Johns Hopkins University alumni
University of Pennsylvania School of Engineering and Applied Science alumni
Engineers from New Jersey
21st-century women engineers
Women bioengineers
21st-century African-American people
21st-century African-American women
20th-century African-American people
20th-century African-American women
Women engineers